Gopi is a 1970 Hindi film produced by T. S. Muthuswami & S. S. Palaniappan and directed by A. Bhimsingh. It stars Dilip Kumar, Saira Banu in lead roles, with Pran, Om Prakash, Nirupa Roy, Farida Jalal, Johnny Walker, Ramayan Tiwari, Mukri, Sudesh Kumar, Durga Khote, Lalita Pawar in other important roles. The music was composed by Kalyanji-Anandji.

This is a remake of 1964 simultaneously shot Kannada Movie Chinnada Gombe and Tamil movie Muradan Muthu, which was produced and directed by B. R. Panthulu. This film is remembered for Om Prakash and Dilip Kumar's classic acting.

As reported by Box Office India, Gopi was a big hit at the box office.

Cast 
 Dilip Kumar as Gopiram "Gopi"
 Saira Banu as Seema
 Pran as Lala
 Om Prakash as Girdharilal
 Nirupa Roy as Parvati
 Farida Jalal as Nandini
 Johnny Walker as Ramu
 Ramayan Tiwari as Hariram
 Mukri as Ramlal
 Sudesh Kumar as Kumar
 Durga Khote as Ranimaa
 Lalita Pawar as Leelavati

Production 
According to film expert Rajesh Subramanian, Rajendra Kumar was first signed for the film. The producers felt Saira Banu and Dilip Kumar would make a perfect pair and requested Rajendra Kumar to return the signing amount and quit the film.

Awards 
 1971: Filmfare Best Actor Award: Dilip Kumar (nominated)

Music 
The film's music is by Kalyanji-Anandji and the lyrics were penned by Rajinder Krishan.

References

External links 
 

1970 films
1970s Hindi-language films
Films directed by A. Bhimsingh
Films scored by Kalyanji Anandji
Hindi remakes of Kannada films